Into the Valley of Death is the third studio album by American hardcore punk band Death by Stereo. It was released on April 22, 2003, as their second album on Epitaph Records. The enhanced CD version of this album has a video for "Wasted Words" included.

Track listing

Personnel

Death by Stereo
 Efrem Schulz – vocals, additional guitar
 Dan Palmer – lead guitar, backing vocals
 Jim Miner – rhythm guitar, backing vocals
 Paul Miner – bass, backing vocals
 Todd Hennig – drums, backing vocals

Additional credits
 Tim "Tito" Owens – additional guitar
 Rob Aston, Ron Lomas, Vijay Kumar, Dave Itow, Dave Mandel, Shannon Dietz, Sid Dynamite, Benny Kane and Andrew Tabizon (additional vocals)
 Recorded at Sound City Studios and Death Tracks
 Mixed at For the Record
 Engineered by Paul Miner
 Assistant Engineered by Pete Martinez, Oliver and Efrem Schulz
 Mastered by Paul Miner at Q-Mark

Dave Mandel provided backing vocals on this album. He is the owner of Indecision Records, Death by Stereo's first label.

External links
 Epitaph Records
 Death by Stereo's official website

Death by Stereo albums
2003 albums
Epitaph Records albums
Albums recorded at Sound City Studios